Equal Love is an Australian-wide campaign initiated by the Victorian Gay and Lesbian Rights Lobby in an attempt to win gay and lesbian couples marriage rights in the country. The campaign involves a range of community, union, student and activist organisations whose aim is to influence public and government attitudes towards LGBT couples through education and direct action.

History
The campaign began in 2004 in response to the Marriage Amendment Bill, introduced by the John Howard Government which was passed by the Australian House of Representatives in June of that year, which stated that a same-sex union "must not be recognised as a marriage in Australia." In 2009, an Equal Love spokesperson claimed that "60% of Australians support equal same-sex marriage rights and the introduction of the gender neutral bill. Equal marriage rights are becoming a significant and central human rights issue." In 2010, tens of thousands of Australians participated in Equal Love demonstrations for same-sex marriage.

Equal Love has had the support of Amnesty International, the Australian Greens and other notable individuals such as Victorian Labor Party Minister for Education Bronwyn Pike, The Lord of the Rings star Ian McKellen and Australian Idol finalist Rob Mills.

In lobbying for same-sex marriage, the two organisations Equal Love and Community Action Against Homophobia share similar objectives.

Notable achievements

In 2010, Equal Love won an ALSO Foundation  award in the category of 'Most Significant Activist of the Year' in the Australian LGBT community. The ALSO Foundation is Victoria's largest not-for-profit LGBT community organisation. Equal Love's Convener, Ali Hogg, won an ALSO award the same year as the 'Most Outstanding Volunteer' for her work in the campaign. In 2011, Hogg was recognised in the 'Absolut People's Choice' award as the country's most influential LGBT person for her work in Equal Love, as part of Same Same's '25 Most Influential LGBTI Australians'. Equal Love were critical of former Australian Prime Minister Julia Gillard's position on same-sex marriage voting against the party policy change and against it becoming a binding vote and allowing members a conscience vote.

In 2016 Equal Love and The Australian Marriage Equality led the Pride Parade in St Kilda Victoria; this was the 1st time both groups had united to demand same-sex marriage Equal Love criticises Prime Minister Malcolm Turnbull with Wallace saying "he’s done us a lot of damage because he’s taken a vote off the table and said the way forward is a plebiscite".

Criticism
Melbourne is the countries largest Equal Love movement but each state and territory manage their own activisms.  The Brisbane campaign group has been criticised from within its own ranks, as well as by the wider LGBT community. The criticism has included concern about the close links Equal Love has to both the Socialist Alternative and the Socialist Alliance.  The incorporation of other protest-issues within Equal Love rallies, as well as the "offensive" signs, the tee-shirt "profanity", along with the militancy of Equal Love participants have all raised concerns. Equal Love works with other Australian LGBTIQ groups including the Community Action Against Homophobia. Rodney Croome National Convener of Australian Marriage Equality has expressed concerns about radical campaigning methods, saying, "It is also a double standard to demand respect for same-sex relationships without showing the same respect in return".

National supporters

Amnesty International
Australian Democrats
Australian Coalition for Equality
Australian Education Union
Australian Greens
Australian Marriage Equality
Australian Services Union
Comeout
Communications, Electrical and Plumbing Union of Australia
Community and Public Sector Union
Council of Australian Postgraduate Associations
Democratic Socialist Perspective
Finance Sector Union

Freedom Socialist Party
Gaydar
Green Left Weekly
Human Rights Council of Australia
Liquor, Hospitality and Miscellaneous Union
National Tertiary Education Union
National Union of Students
Parents and Friends of Lesbians and Gays
Rainbow Labor
Same Same
Socialist Alliance
Socialist Alternative
Young Australian Democrats

Rallies
2010 Australian gender equality rallies

See also

Australian Marriage Equality 
Community Action Against Homophobia
LGBT rights in Australia
List of LGBT rights organisations

References

External links
Equal Love

LGBT history in Australia
LGBT political advocacy groups in Australia
2004 establishments in Australia
Same-sex marriage in Australia